Przybiernów  (formerly ) is a village in Goleniów County, West Pomeranian Voivodeship, in north-western Poland. It is the seat of the gmina (administrative district) called Gmina Przybiernów.

The village has a population of 1,700.

References

Villages in Goleniów County